Charles David Alexander John Sparrow Acheson, 7th Earl of Gosford (born 13 July 1942) is a British peer and artist. He was a member of the House of Lords from 1966 to 1999.

The son of Archibald Alexander John Stanley Acheson, 6th Earl of Gosford, and his wife Francesca Augusta Maria Cagiati, he was educated at Harrow School, the Byam Shaw School of Art, and the Royal Academy Schools.

On 17 February 1966, he succeeded his father as Earl of Gosford (1806), Viscount Gosford (1785), Baron Gosford of Market Hill (1776), Baron Acheson of Clancairney (1847), and Baron Worlingham of Beccles (1835), and also as the 13th Acheson baronet in the baronetage of Nova Scotia (1628). The later two baronies are in the peerage of the United Kingdom and gave him a seat in the House of Lords from 1966 to 1999. He is not recorded as having spoken there.

He was Chairman of the Artists' Union from 1976 to 1980.

In 1983, Gosford married Lynette Redmond.

The former family seat was Gosford Castle, which was not lived in after 1921, when the contents were sold. The 6th Earl sold the surrounding estate to the Northern Ireland Forestry Commission in 1958.

Notes

1942 births
Alumni of the Byam Shaw School of Art
Living people
Earls of Gosford
People educated at Harrow School